Nerima Wako-Ojiwa (née Nerima Wako), is a Kenyan political analyst, who serves as the executive director of Siasa Place, an organization, led by young people that engages young Kenyans, educating them about the constitution, governance and electoral processes, through community engagements and social media.

Background and education
Nerima was born in Nairobi, Kenya's capital, circa 1989, the third-born in a family of four children. She attended St. Nicholas Primary School, before finishing her high school at Aga Khan Academy, both in Nairobi.

After high school, she secured a scholarship to study at Jacksonville State University, in Jacksonville, Alabama in the United States. She graduated with a Bachelor of Arts degree in Journalism and Sociology. Later, she was awarded a Master of Public Administration degree, also by Jacksonville State University.

Career
While at university, Nerima participated in campus politics and was elected president of the International Student's Organization. This allowed her to receive a solid grounding in her political attributes and weaknesses.

In 2015, she together with other young people started a youth-led organization called Siasa Place. For the first year, they funded the organization's operations out of their own pockets, before they received any outside funding. Nerima serves as the executive director.

Family
Nerima is married to Billian Ojiwa, who is also involved in politics. She is a niece to Senator Amos Wako who represents  Busia County in the Kenyan Senate, (2013–2017) and (2017–2022).

See also
 Susan Oguya
 Borna Nyaoke-Anoke

References

External links
 Cost of living: Ok, it's officially time to panic (or go get at least three jobs) As of 13 September 2018.

1989 births
Living people
Jackson State University alumni
People from Nairobi
21st-century Kenyan women politicians
21st-century Kenyan politicians